Otay Mountain is a mountain located in San Diego County, California. It is the highest summit of the San Ysidro Mountains. The mountain is located in the Otay Mountain Wilderness Area. The physical border separating Mexico and the United States (which can be found near Otay Mountain) has received criticism for the harm it allegedly perpetuated to the environment, both in its construction and in its very nature.

History 
The name "Otay" comes from the Kumeyaay word otai, which means "brushy".

On March 16, 1991, a Hawker Siddeley HS-125 airplane carrying seven members of singer Reba McEntire's band, plus her business manager and two pilots, crashed into the side of the mountain after taking off from nearby Brown Field Municipal Airport, killing all ten on board.

Otay Mountain has had several wildfire incidents in the past. The plant life in Otay Mountain "burned completely" in 2003, and another wildfire happened later in 2007.

A border fence spanning the Mexico–United States border can be found in the Otay Mountain area in order to prevent illegal immigrants from crossing the national border. The border fence has received criticism for its effects on nature and wilderness. In particular, the construction was criticized by author Rob Davis for creating a harsh environment for a species of butterfly due to dust being kicked up by trucks. The fence in the area is estimated to cost approximately $16 million per mile.

References

San Ysidro Mountains
Mountains of San Diego County, California
Mountains of Southern California